Osama Al-Zain is a Palestinian filmmaker and writer. He received his undergraduate degree in Computer Engineering from the University of Jordan. After winning the Moris Sheer Award for short videos at The International Competition for Students Artist sponsored by Savannah College of Art and Design, he moved to the USA to pursue his graduate studies in film and video. He finished his Master's degree of Arts in Film and Video from the American University, in Washington DC.

Osama Al-Zain has worked on documentaries about social and political issues. His credits include writing, producing, and directing shorts, documentaries, and public service announcements.

Transparency, a 2002  award-winning documentary , which he produced and directed, was screened in more than 16 cities in the US, Europe and the Middle East.

In 2005 Al-Zain released Palestine Post 9/11, a feature-length documentary which he produced and directed about the events of 9/11 from a Palestinian perspective.

The Dean العميدة-هيلين توماس , a 2014 two-part documentary mini series Osama Al-Zain produced and directed about the life and career of the late journalist Helen Thomas.

In 2017 Al-Zain released Gamal Abd El-Nasser Revisited جمال عبد الناصر - زيارة جديدة , a seven-part biographical documentary series he produced and directed about the life and political journey of the Arab leader Gamal Abd El-Nasser Gamal Abdel Nasser

Osama Al-Zain lives in the States where he works as film producer/director. He's currently the CEO of IG-Creative-Group based in Washington DC.

External links
 Palestine Post 911 at Cinema Guild
 Palestine Post 911 review by Dr. Marwan Asmar on Countercurrents.org
 Transparency at Zahra Pictures
 FEMINIST RESPONSES TO VEILING: FOUR BOOKS AND TWO FILMS
 Osama Al-Zain Oral Memoir Transcript-Baylor University Digital Collection.
 Osama Al-Zain Oral Memoir Audio Recording-Baylor University Digital Collection.
 Osama Al-Zain- 30 Notable alumni of University of Jordan

Osama Al-Zain at "Dreams of a Nation", Columbia University.

Living people
American University School of Communication alumni
Palestinian film directors
University of Jordan alumni
Year of birth missing (living people)